Royal Air Force Ridgewell or more simply RAF Ridgewell is a former Royal Air Force station located at Ridgewell,  north west of Halstead, Essex, England.

During the Second World War, the airfield was used by the Royal Air Force and the United States Army Air Forces Eighth Air Force.

History
RAF Ridgewell was an early example of stations completed to Class A heavy bomber airfield design for the RAF, and had three intersecting runways of 6,500 ft each in length, thirty-six hardstands, two T-2 hangars and accommodation for 2,900 men in temporary buildings.

RAF Bomber Command use
The airfield was opened in December 1942 and was first used by No. 90 Squadron of RAF Bomber Command, equipped with Short Stirling Bombers until May 1943, the station being at that time a satellite of RAF Stradishall.

USAAF use
RAF Ridgewell was the only long-term heavy bomber airfield of the Eighth Air Force in Essex.  For United States Army Air Forces (USAAF) use, the number of hardstandings was increased to the fifty required by a US bomb group.  The station was part of the 1st Combat Wing establishment of the 1st Division and was the furthest east of its thirteen heavy bomber stations. It was assigned USAAF designation Station 167, station code "RD".

381st Bombardment Group

From 30 June 1943 the airfield was used by the USAAF 381st Bombardment Group (Heavy), arriving from Pueblo AAB, Colorado.  Its tail code was Triangle-L.  The 381st Bomb Group consisted of the following operational squadrons and fuselage codes:

 532nd Bombardment Squadron (VE)
 533nd Bombardment Squadron (VP)
 534th Bombardment Squadron (GD)
 535th Bombardment Squadron (MS)

After V-E Day, the 381st Bomb Group returned to Sioux Falls AAF, South Dakota in July 1945 and was inactivated on 28 August.

Air Ministry use
After the war, RAF Ridgewell was used for bomb storage from 15 July 1945 to 31 March 1957.  It was then disposed of and sold.  The United States Air Force retained the old aircraft hangars which were used by units from nearby RAF Wethersfield and RAF Alconbury for storage until both airfields were closed in the early 1990s.

Current use
With the end of military control, the majority of the airfield was returned to agriculture, with the buildings and control tower being torn down.  The concrete runways and hardstands were removed for hardcore, although much of the perimeter track was reused for country roads, albeit at a reduced width.

Recently part of the airfield has been purchased by the Essex gliding club and is their home location for gliding throughout the summer months.

Memorials
There are several memorials to the men of RAF Ridgewell.  One is dedicated to the men of RAF 90 Squadron, while a second is dedicated to the USAAF 381st Bombardment Group.  Both are located on the site of the USAAF airfield hospital, where a small museum is also located. A further memorial commemorates those who lost their lives in a bomb loading accident on 23 June 1943. Constructed in October 2014, the memorial is located close to the site of the explosion next to RAF Ridgewell's former perimeter track at Ovington.

See also

List of former Royal Air Force stations

References

Citations

Bibliography
 Comer, John. Combat Crew: The true story of one man's part in World War II's allied bomber offensive. Time Warner Paperbacks, 2003. 

 Freeman, Roger A. (1991) The Mighty Eighth The Colour Record. Cassell & Co. 

   www.controltowers.co.uk Ridgewell
 mighty8thaf.preller.us Ridgewell
 USAAS-USAAC-USAAF-USAF Aircraft Serial Numbers--1908 to present

External links

 Ridgewell Airfield Commemorative Association
 Ridgewell Airfield Commemorative Museum
 381st Bomb Group Website
 RAF Ridgewell 70th Anniversary Twitter Timeline

Airfields of the VIII Bomber Command in the United Kingdom
Military units and formations established in 1942
Royal Air Force stations in Essex
Royal Air Force stations of World War II in the United Kingdom